Route 136 is a state highway in the U.S. state of Massachusetts. The highway runs  from the Rhode Island state line in Swansea north to its end in Rehoboth in western Bristol County. Route 136 connects Interstate 195 (I-195) and U.S. Route 6 (US 6) with Warren, Rhode Island.

Route description
Route 136 begins along two-lane market Market Street at the Rhode Island state line in the town of Swansea. Market Street continues south as Rhode Island Route 136 into Warren. The highway heads north and temporarily expands to a four-lane divided highway at its intersection with US 6 (Grand Army of the Republic Highway), where the route's name becomes James Reynolds Road. Route 136 has a four-ramp partial cloverleaf interchange with I-195, then enters the town of Rehoboth as Kingsley Way. The state highway ends and continues as a town road at an arbitrary location between the town line and Davis Street to the north. Route 136 is a part of the National Highway System from its southern end to I-195.

Junction list

References

136
Transportation in Bristol County, Massachusetts